Bolbanabad District is a district (bakhsh) in Dehgolan County, Kurdistan Province, Iran. At the 2006 census, its population was 16,855, in 3,981 families.  The District has one city: Bolbanabad. The District has two rural districts (dehestan): Sis Rural District and Yeylaq-e Jonubi Rural District.

References 

Dehgolan County
Districts of Kurdistan Province